Digor may refer to:

 Digor (sports), a traditional sport in Bhutan
 Digor dialect, a dialect of the Ossetian language
 Digor, Kars, a district in Turkey's Kars Province
 Digor (people), a sub-division of the Ossetians.